Zelyonye Prudy is a rural locality (a village) in Styopantsevskoye Rural Settlement, Vyaznikovsky District, Vladimir Oblast, Russia. The population was 14 as of 2010.

Geography 
The village is located on the Vazhel River, 10 km south from Styopantsevo, 41 km south-west from Vyazniki.

References 

Rural localities in Vyaznikovsky District